The Turkish Ice Hockey Super League (abbreviated TBHSL) is the highest level of professional ice hockey in Turkey. It is operated under the jurisdiction of the Turkish Ice Hockey Federation, a member of the International Ice Hockey Federation. Unlike the National Hockey League, the Super League is not divided into conferences; teams compete in a single division. The league currently consists of six teams, from two cities.

The champion of the league qualifies for the first round of the IIHF Continental Cup.

History  
The Bel-Pa Ice Rink hosted the first match ever played in compliance with the IIHF rules and regulations, at the end of 1989 between Ankara Tarım Kredi Spor and Istanbul Paten Kulübü teams.

As of January 1990, ice hockey in Turkey was operated under the jurisdiction of the Turkish Ski Federation, and the first official championship ever was organized among two teams from Ankara and two from Istanbul. Ankara Büyükşehir Belediyesi, Istanbul Paten Kulübü, Ankara Atatürk Buz Hokeyi Takımı and İstanbul Boğaziçi Patinaj Klübü has participated to the championship and B.B. Ankara SK became the champion.

The rising interest in ice hockey effected the increasing number of players and then the teams. The Turkish Ice Hockey Federation was founded in 1991. Rino Ouellette, a Canadian diplomat in Ankara, who coached two teams consecutively, contributed much to the development of ice hockey sport in Turkey. A tournament, organized in 1992, laid the ground stone for the establishment of Turkey's first ice hockey league in 1993.

TBHSL seasons

2016–17 season 
The 2016–17 league season was sponsored again by "Didi".

Standings
The 2016–17 league ended with Zeytinburnu SK leading. The first four leading teams were promoted to play semi-finals.

2017 Playoffs
League leader played against the 4th ranked team, the runner-up against the third ranked. Zeytinburnu SK became 2016–17 league champion defeating Erzurum BB GSK by 2–0 in five final matches.

2015–16 season 
The 2015–16 league season was sponsored by the iced tea brand "Didi" of the state-owned Turkish Tea Producers Corporation Çaykur, and named so Didi TBHSL.
 
Teams
The clubs played in the 2015–16 season are listed below, alongside their home towns. The leagues matches were played in two groups, the East Division and the West Divisionp.

Standings
The 2015–16 league ended with İzmir BB GSK leading. The first four leading teams were promoted to play semi-finals.

2016 Playoffs
League leader played against the 4th ranked team, the runner-up against the third ranked. Zeytinburnu SK became 2015–16 league champion defeating İzmir BB GSK by 3–2 in five final matches.

2009–10 season 
Final Standings

Kocaeli BB had to surrender three of its wins when it was discovered that a player was playing with an illegal transfer card. Therefore, for playoff standings, Kocaeli BB would take the 4th seed and Polis would take the 3rd seed.

Teams

2010 Playoffs

2010 All-Star Game
On March 13, 2010 the Super League All-Star Game will be held in Ankara at the Bel-Pa arena. The game will be televised on TRT and there will be a special guest appearance by Turkish Pop Star Nil Karaibrahimgil. After the game Nil Karaibrahimgil will be performing at a club in Ankara for the players and fans who attend the All-Star Game.

2008–09 season
Teams
The clubs played in the 2008–2009 season are listed below, alongside their home towns.

Season structure
In the 2008–09 regular season, each team played 10 games. The four best teams at the conclusion of regular season proceed to the play-offs where semifinals and the final are all played. Games are played over 3 rounds. Higher-ranking teams play the first match at home. Teams are paired up for each round according to regular season results. The highest-ranking team will play against the lowest-ranking and second highest against the second lowest. Team which finishes the league in last position relegates to the Turkish Ice Hockey First League.

League starts at the end of December and finishes in early May. Games are mostly played on Saturday or Sunday.

The TBHSL's points system is different from the ice hockey leagues in Europe. 3 points are awarded for a win, 1 points for tie and 0 points for a loss.

Standings

Note: GF= Goals for, GA = Goals against

Ice hockey rinks

Currently, Turkish Ice Hockey Super League games are played by teams in four cities including Istanbul, Ankara, İzmir and Erzurum. Ice hockey rinks hosting the TBHSL are Silivrikapı Ice Skating Hall (seating capacity: 900) and Zeytinburnu Ice Rink (700) in Istanbul, Ankara Ice Skating Palace (1,150) in Ankara, Bornova Ice Sports Hall (1,751) in İzmir, Palandöken Ice Skating Hall (2,000) and Yakutiye Ice Skating Hall (3,000 and 500) in Erzurum. Another olympic-sized ice hockey rink is Kocaeli B.B. Ice Arena (3,600) in İzmit.

Champions
Since 1992–93, a regular Turkish national league is staged. In the first ever edition, six teams competed and B.B. Ankara crowned themselves the champion, by winning all five games. This team has earned the most titles – seven in all. They battled out their last championship in the 2002–03 season. Polis Akademisi ve Koleji (Police Academy) won five championships and has been the most successful team in recent years. Kocaeli B.B. Kağıt S.K. from İzmit was stopped after reigning from 2004. Since the beginning of the Turkish Ice Hockey Super League, Ankara teams have earned the most titles. Apart from the teams based in Ankara, only Istanbul Paten Kulübü and Kocaeli B.B. Kağıt have won the championship.

Performance by club

† Club has folded and is no longer operating.

IIHF Continental Cup
2017–18 Continental Cup – First Round – Group A

2016–17 Continental Cup – First Round – Group A

2016–17 Continental Cup – Second Round – Group B

2015–16 Continental Cup – First Round – Group A

2014–15 Continental Cup – First Group Stage – Group A

2013–14 IIHF Continental Cup
Did not participate.

2012–13 Continental Cup – First Group Stage – Group A

2011–12 Continental Cup – First Group Stage – Group A

† HC Metulla withdrew from tournament in July, 2011

2010–11 Continental Cup – First Group Stage – Group A.

† Energija Elektrenai were not able to compete in the tournament because their airline went bankrupt the day of their departure to Spain.

Turkish teams' Continental Cup results

From 1999 to 2002, two clubs qualified for Turkey. Only one year (2000) did both Turkish clubs compete in the same Group.
 DNP: Did Not Participate

See also
Turkish Ice Hockey First League
Turkey national men's ice hockey team
List of ice hockey leagues

References

External links
Turkish Ice Hockey Federation

 
Top tier ice hockey leagues in Europe
Sports leagues established in 1993
1993 establishments in Turkey
Professional ice hockey leagues in Turkey